A ribbon is a thin band of flexible material, typically of cloth.

Ribbon may also refer to:

Awareness ribbon a ribbon worn to signify sympathy for, and raise awareness of, a cause espoused by the wearer
Ribbon (band), a Japanese J-pop group which consist of Hiromi Nagasaku, Arimi Matsuno and Aiko Satō
Ribbon bar, small devices worn by military, police, fire service personnel or by civilians
Ribbon cable, a cable with many conducting wires running parallel to each other on the same flat plane
Ribbon (company), an online payments company
Ribbon (computing), user interface concept
Ribbon Communications, a technology company based in Westford, Massachusetts, United States
Ribbon diagram (or Richardson diagram), 3D schematic representation of protein structure
Ribbon (film), a 2017 Indian film
Ribbon, Kentucky
Ribbon knot, a restricted type of mathematical knot
Ribbon (mathematics), a geometrical smooth strip
Ribbon Ridge AVA, Oregon wine region in Yamhill County
Ribbon (rhythmic gymnastics), a component of rhythmic gymnastics
Ribbon Takanashi, Japanese professional wrestler
Ribbon theory, a strand of mathematics within topology
Ribbon, typewriter, an inked band of fabric used for typewriters, receipt printers and dot-matrix printers
Ribon, a monthly Japanese shōjo manga magazine
Ribbons (album), a 2019 album by Bibio
Ribbons, a character in the Doctor Who episode "It Takes You Away"
Ribbon (EP), a 2021 EP by Thai singer BamBam